This is a discography of the Mongolian heavy metal band Hurd.

Studio albums

The Best Collection I 

The Best Collection I is Hurd's debut album. Recorded between the years of 1993-1995, and released along with The Best Collection II, it is considered to be one of the first heavy metal albums in Mongolian music history.

5 songs from The Best Collection I were re-arranged and played acoustically during the 1998 Unplugged concert.

Hurd released their first music video for Chono, where the band is seen playing the song near an abandoned factory. It also contains numerous battle scenes from a 1945 movie about Tsogt Taij. It is told that the band members grew quickly tired and behaved impatiently during the filming, as they were not yet familiar with the process.

Mongolian traditional music instruments were used for the recording of Bakharkhal, most notably the Morin khuur. This song is among the first in a long list of patriotic songs written by Hurd.

Track listing

Additional personnel

 S.Ishkhüü - keyboards
 Kh.Bayarbold - technician
 A.Bayarmagnai - technician

The Best Collection II 

The Best Collection II is Hurd's second studio album. It was recorded and released in conjunction with The Best Collection I, and as a result the two albums are sometimes seen together as a double album.

Compared to its counterpart, the style and lyrical theme of The Best Collection II is somewhat darker (dealing with night, darkness, fear, cemetery, ...), and the songs are rather fast paced, with Khar darsan züüd being one of the fastest songs in Hurd's repertoire.

The hugely successful Tsergiin bodol ("Soldier's Thoughts") is considered a classic and allowed the band to reach celebrity. The song was written by Dambyn Ganbold in 1978, while he was in military service, his fellow soldiers helping him up on the lyrics.

It is told that, during a performance in an all-star concert, Hurd had a 3 song setlist that included Tsergiin bodol, but under popular demand they ended up playing the song three times in a row. Other famous songs from the album include Baga nas, Zurag shig büsgüi and Nulimsaa tevch'ye.

Hurd's 1998 Unplugged acoustic concert includes no less than 8 songs from The Best Collection II.

Track listing

Additional personnel

 S.Ishkhüü - keyboards
 Kh.Bayarbold - technician
 A.Bayarmagnai - technician

Ödör Shönö 

Ödör Shönö ("day and night") is Hurd's third studio album.

It is the only album where the band has changed its name to "Erel-Hurd", the album being the beginning of their 8-year partnership with Erel company. The name "Erel-Hurd" also appears on the compilation cassette Shildeg duu from that same era.

 was written by D. Ganbold, who also authored the hugely successful  from The Best Collection II. The track contains a recording from 1978 of D. Ganbold singing .

 was not listed on the original release of the album, leading fans to give it the title  (Өнө эртний үеэс) before the release of the Black Box boxset in 2013, where the official name of the song was finally revealed. On the original 1999 release, the track was track 4, but it was moved to the end of the album on the Black Box.

Track listing

Myangan Jild Gants 

Myangan Jild Gants ("once in a thousand years") is Hurd's fourth studio album.

In this album, besides their usual rock ballads and heavy metal songs, Hurd has made their first attempts of writing nu metal material. That can be attested by such songs as Üg sons or Gar utas, as some of the singing is rapped and there is some use of turntables. Hurd would continue the rap rock theme on their song "Sain muu", on the followup album Mongold Törsön.

Khelekh n' khegjüün is the fastest and also the shortest song in all of Hurd's catalog. Shine jil is an outtake from the Best Collection sessions and previously appeared on The Best Collection 3.

Track listing

Additional personnel

 Kh.Nergüi - engineering, mixing
 Kh.Bayarbold - technician
 B.Batbayar - technician
 B.Bat-Erdene - technician
 N.Byambadorj - technician

Mongold Törsön 

Mongold Törsön ("born in Mongolia") is Hurd's fifth studio album.

According to the band's comments in the Enhanced CD section, they wanted to make a softer sounding album and try out different rock music genres. For the first time, Hurd has written songs in rock and roll style. Also notable is the collaboration with hip-hop artists Ice Top, Digital and 2 Khüü on Sain muu. Nutag min' ünertdeg features two famous Mongolian wrestling champions G. Ösökhbayar and D. Mönkh-Erdene.

The band also comments that Mongold Törsön was specially dedicated to all the mongolians living abroad. Indeed, the overarching theme of the album is family, homeland, and national pride.

In 2004, Hurd's tour supporting Mongold Törsön in Inner Mongolia was cancelled, as reportedly the Chinese authorities feared civil unrest.

The song Rock n' roll was later retitled to Namaig toogoogüi büsgüid bayar khürgeye (Намайг тоогоогүй бүсгүйд баяр хүргэе).

Track listing

Züirlekh Argagüi 

Züirlekh Argagüi ("uncomparable") is Hurd's sixth studio album.

Track listing

Additional personnel

 D.Lkhagvaa - technician
 N.Bondoo - technician

Khairyn Salkhi 

In November 2009, the band has announced through their official website the upcoming release of their seventh studio album, Khairyn Salkhi ("wind of love").

The album took 1 year to be finished and contains 12 songs that revolve around the theme of love. Its cover was uploaded, but only a few homemade cassette and CD-R copies of the album circulated. At least one (semi-)official silver CD pressing was done in Inner Mongolia, although it is very rare and the only copy located does not have any identifying marks on it. The album was finally given an official release in 2013 in the Black Box boxset.

The songs Nogoon shugüi and Chamaig zorino date back to at least 1998, being recorded at the concert at Top Ten nightclub in Ulaanbaatar that was immortalised on the 1999 album Unplugged. On the initial tape copies, Nogoon shugüi was labeled as Durlaj üzsengüi.

Track listing

Narlag Divaajin 

Narlag Divaajin ("sunny paradise") is Hurd's eighth studio album, released as a double album in 2016.

Track listing

7,000,000,000 

7,000,000,000 ("7 billion") is Hurd's ninth studio album, released in 2021.

The title song Doloon terbum features Uka.

Track listing

Additional personnel

 N.Naranbaatar - recording engineer
 G.Battüvshin - recording engineer
 Maxim Komov - mixing and mastering

Compilation albums

The Best Collection III 

The Best Collection III is an album by Hurd, composed of various B-sides and previously unreleased songs.

Ekh oron features late B.Damchaa, a famous mongolian actor. Khamag Mongol features pop singer Sarantuya and former Chingis Khaan singer D.Jargalsaikhan.

Ekh oron, Manlailan devegchiin duu and Bi Mongoltoigoo adilkhan were released as a single in 1999. Züüdend irsen eej was released in 1999 as a B-side to the Aavdaa bi khairtai/Bayangol düüregtee örgökh duu single, while Shine jil was released later in 2001 on Myangan Jild Gants.

Track listing

Live albums

Unplugged 

In the fall of 1998, Hurd played a series of sold-out acoustic concerts at a now-defunct Ulan Bator nightclub, Top Ten. One of these concerts was recorded and released as Unplugged. The album features 8 songs from The Best Collection II, 5 from The Best Collection I and 3 previously unreleased songs.

Chamaig zorino is the only Hurd song written by singer D.Tömörtsog. Eejdee örgökh duu is a well known mongolian folk song.

Chamaig zorino and Nogoon shugüi were recorded in the studio a decade later for Khairyn Salkhi.

When the album was originally released, Chamaig zorino and Kharankhui were indexed as one track. When the album was reissued in the Black Box boxset in 2013, the two songs were separated.

Track listing

Additional personnel

 S.Ishkhüü - vocals on Eejdee
 S.Nergüi - engineering
 Kh.Bayarbold - mixing

Video albums

Talarkhalyn Kontsert 

Talarkhalyn Kontsert or "The Gratitude Concert" was one of Hurd's biggest outdoor shows, which took place at the Sükhbaatar Square on Naadam day. It was a free concert celebrating the band's 10th anniversary, held before a crowd of 80,000 to 100,000 people,

which is a record for Mongolia.

On June 26, 2009, the band released a DVD of this show and organized a release party at the Grand Khan pub in Ulan Bator.

Track listing

Additional personnel

 D.Ganbayar - percussion, drums
 Mönkh-Erdene - keyboard

Unplugged II 

In December 2005, Hurd played a second acoustic concert, dubbed Unplugged II, at The Cultural Palace of Ulan Bator. In 2009, a DVD with the video footage of that concert was released.

A previous lower quality version of this DVD was released in 2006 for promotional purposes only, but had a limited distribution.

In 2012, the audio from this concert was released on iTunes.

Track listing

Additional personnel

 D.Ganbayar - mandolin, melodica, percussion
 Amgalan - classical guitar
 Mönkh-Erdene - keyboard
 Buyan-Arvijikh, D.Navaantseren - accordion
 Nyamtuya, Saranchimeg, Odontsetseg - backing vocals

References 

Heavy metal group discographies
Discographies of Mongolian artists